122 (one hundred [and] twenty-two) is the natural number following 121 and preceding 123.

In mathematics
122 is a nontotient since there is no integer with exactly 122 coprimes below it. Nor is there an integer with exactly 122 integers with common factors below it, making 122 a noncototient.

122 is a semiprime.

122 is the sum of squares of the divisors of 11.

φ(122) = φ(σ(122)).

In telephony
 The fire emergency telephone number in Austria
 The police emergency telephone number in Egypt
 The traffic emergency telephone number in China
 The police emergency telephone number in Bosnia and Herzegovina

In other fields
122 is also:
 The atomic number of the chemical element unbibium 
 The number of men of Michmas at the census (Bible, Nehemiah 7:31)
 The Enroute Flight Advisory Service (EFAS) "Flight Watch" frequency: 122.0 MHz
 The oldest age in years to which a human being has ever been authenticated to live (Jeanne Calment).

See also
 List of highways numbered 122
 United Nations Security Council Resolution 122

References

Integers